Straight Flush: The True Story of Six College Friends Who Dealt Their Way to a Billion-Dollar Online Poker Empire—and How It All Came Crashing Down is a book by Ben Mezrich. The text was published on May 28, 2013, by William Morrow and Company. Straight Flush tells the story of a group of University of Montana students who turned their weekly poker game into AbsolutePoker.com, one of the largest online gambling companies in the world.

Reception
Straight Flush received mixed to scathing reviews.  James McManus wrote in the Wall Street Journal that Straight Flush was "not just a book about clueless adolescent venality, 'Straight Flush' is that sorry thing itself, and in spades."  Haley Hintze, a writer who helped uncover the Absolute Poker scandal, labeled the book a "literary fraud" in an eleven part series.

Don Oldenburg writing in USA Today notes one of the book's problems is "how much Mezrich himself seems in awe of" the sordid activity he is describing.

See also
The Eudaemonic Pie

References

External links

Poker books
2013 non-fiction books
William Morrow and Company books
Non-fiction books about gambling